Nikolai Myaskovsky's Symphony No. 20 in E major, his Op. 50, was written in 1940.  It is dedicated to Yuri Shaporin. The symphony was premiered on 28 November 1940 by Nikolai Golovanov conducting the Large All-Union Radio SO. It has three movements:
Allegro con spirito (ca. 8 minutes)
Adagio, in C major (ca. 9 minutes, initial tempo quarter note=52)
Allegro inquieto, in E minor (ca. 10 minutes)

The first movement is in sonata form.  The Adagio is on two themes, in C and in A, which appear contrapuntally at the reappearance of the first; it has the form A-B (l'Istesso tempo, Andantino)-A'-B'-coda.  The finale is a rondo whose E major concluding pages incorporate a climactic reappearance by the main theme of the Adagio, leading Richard Taruskin to remark of this symphony that it is Myaskovsky's "Land of Hope and Glory".

References

Recordings
Yevgeny Svetlanov, Russian Federation Academic Symphony Orchestra, 1991-3 recordings appearing variously on Russian Disc, Olympia OCD 739, and Warner CDs

20
1940 compositions
1940 in the Soviet Union
Compositions in E major
1940 in Russia